Streamline is the fourth studio album by American country music artist Lee Greenwood, released in 1985. It was number one on US Country charts.

Track listing

Musicians
Compiled from liner notes.
David Briggs – keyboards
 Pete Bordonali – guitar
 Carol Chase - background vocals
 Steve Gibson – guitar
 Greg Gordon - background vocals
 Lee Greenwood - lead vocals, harmonica
 David Hungate – bass guitar
 Dave Innis – keyboards
 John Barlow Jarvis – keyboards
 Jerry Kroon – drums
 Larrie Londin – drums
 Kenny Mims – guitar
 Joe Osborn – bass guitar
 Don Potter – guitar
 Hargus "Pig" Robbins – piano
 Brent Rowan – guitar
 Larry Sasser – steel guitar
 James Stroud – drums
 Jack Williams – bass guitar
 Dennis Wilson - background vocals
 Hurshel Winginton - background vocals
 Curtis Young - background vocals

Strings by the Nashville String Machine, arranged by Bergen White.

Charts

Weekly charts

Year-end charts

References

1985 albums
Lee Greenwood albums
MCA Records albums
Albums produced by Jerry Crutchfield